Cishan District (also spelled Qishan) is a suburban district in northeastern Kaohsiung, Taiwan. It has a area of 94.61 square kilometers, or 36.53 square miles. The population of Cishan is 34,606 as of February 2023. It is the 19th most populous district in Kaohsiung.

History

After the handover of Taiwan from Japan to the Republic of China in 1945, Cishan was organized as an urban township of Kaohsiung County. On 25 December 2010, Kaohsiung County was merged with Kaohsiung City and Cishan was upgraded to a district of the city.

In 2009, then Cishan Township was affected by Typhoon Morakot.

Geography
Area: 
Population: 34,621 (January 2023)

Administrative divisions

The district comprises 21 villages:
1 Dalin　　
2 Zhongzheng
3 Yuanfu　　
4 Tungping
5 Yonghe
6 Ruiji
7 Zhufeng　　   
8 Meizhou　　　　　　
9 Taiping　　
10 Dade　　　
11 Sanxie　　
12 Tungchang
13 Guangfu
14 Kunzhou　
15 Shangzhou
16 Dashan　　　　
17 Zhongzhou　
18 Nanzhou　　
19 Xinguang
20 Nansheng
21 Zhongliao

Education
 Fortune Institute of Technology

Tourist attractions

 Cishan Wude Hall
 Qishan Living Cultural Park
 Qishan Station
 Cishan Tianhou Temple (旗山天后宮)
 Cishan Old Street
 Jhongshan Park
 Mount Ciwei
 Mount Jhongliao Leisure and Agriculture Area
 Stone Arches Corridor 
 Wulong Fongsan Temple (五龍山鳳山寺)

Transportation
A railroad was operated by Taiwan Sugar Company for carrying sugarcanes, cargo, and passenger service from 1910 to 1978 . Trains took more than 100 minutes from Cishan to Jiuqutang railway station, where passengers and goods could be transferred to trains operated by Taiwan Railway Administration. The track was removed in 1982 and the station building at Cishan was preserved as a museum.

Several major highways pass Cishan:
 Provincial Highway 3: Neimen-Cishan-Ligang (Pingtung County)
 Provincial Highway 22: Nanzhi-Yanchao-Cisan-Gaoshu (Pingtung County)
 Provincial Highway 29: Jiaxian-Shanlin-Cishan-Dashu
 National Freeway 10 links Cishan and Zuoying. It connects with National Freeway 3 and National Freeway 1 at Yanchao Junction and Dinjing Junction (Zuoying) respectively

Bus transportation was provided by Kaohsiung Transportation and EDA Bus. Cishan Bus Station is the main transportation hub of Cishan.

Notable natives
 Chen Chien-jen, Vice President of the Republic of China (Taiwan) (2016-2020)
 Lo Ching-lung, baseball player
 Lu Li'an, English professor and People's Republic of China politician
 Ovid Tzeng, Minister of Council for Cultural Affairs (2011-2012)

References

External links

 

Districts of Kaohsiung